Xihu may refer to:

Mainland China
West Lake, Hangzhou, Zhejiang
Xihu District, Benxi, Liaoning
Xihu District, Hangzhou, Zhejiang
Xihu District, Nanchang, Jiangxi
Xihu Township, Jiangxi (zh), subdivision of Fuliang County, Jiangxi

Subdistricts 
Xihu Subdistrict, Lanzhou (zh), subdivision of Qilihe District, Lanzhou, Gansu
Xihu Subdistrict, Chaozhou (zh), subdivision of Xiangqiao District, Chaozhou, Guangdong
Xihu Subdistrict, Leizhou (zh), subdivision of Leizhou, Guangdong
Xihu Subdistrict, Changsha (zh), subdivision of Yuelu District, Changsha, Hunan
Xihu Subdistrict, Nanchang (zh), subdivision of Xihu District, Nanchang, Jiangxi
Xihu Subdistrict, Hangzhou (zh), subdivision of Xihu District, Hangzhou, Zhejiang

Towns
Xihu, Fuyang  (zh), in Yingzhou District, Fuyang, Anhui
Xihu, Tongling (zh), in Shizishan District, Tongling, Anhui
Xihu, Chongqing (zh), in Jiangjin District, Chongqing
Xihu, Guazhou County (zh), in Guazhou County, Gansu
Xihu, Hanshou County (zh), in Hanshou County, Hunan
Xihu, Jiangsu (zh), in Hanjiang District, Yangzhou, Jiangsu
Xihu, Rizhao (zh), in Donggang District, Rizhao, Shandong
Xihu, Yanggu County (zh), in Yanggu County, Shandong
Xihu, Xinjiang (zh), in Wusu, Xinjiang

Taiwan
Xihu, Changhua, township in Changhua County
Xihu, Miaoli, township in Miaoli County